Saint Philip of Gortyna (died 180) was Bishop of Gortyna on Crete. Little is known about him except for his authorship of a now lost treatise against the Gnostics. An Early Christian Apologist, he wrote in the time of Marcus Aurelius against Marcion. He was mentioned with great praise by Dionysius of Corinth in one of his letters to the Christian Community in Gortyna.

References

Bibliography
Eusebius, Hist. eccl., IV., xxiii. 5; Eng. transl., NPNF, 2 ser., i. 201
New Schaff-Herzog Encyclopedia of Religious Knowledge, Vol. IX: Petri – Reuchlin

2nd-century Christian saints
2nd-century bishops in the Roman Empire
180 deaths
Christian apologists
Saints of Roman Crete
Year of birth unknown